Xiangen Hu is a professor in cognitive psychology at the University of Memphis and is a senior researcher at its Institute for Intelligent Systems (IIS).

Background 
Hu obtained an MS in applied mathematics from Huazhong University of Science and Technology in 1985. He then completed an MA in social science in 1991 and Ph.D. in cognitive sciences in 1993 - both at the University of California, Irvine.

Hu is a co-director of the Advanced Distributed Learning (ADL) center. As a member of the ADL Initiative, Hu was one of the first proponents of SCORM. He is also employed as a senior researcher in the Chinese Ministry of Education.

Hu is furthermore a contributor to the Handbook of Latent Semantic Analysis.

References

External links
Hu's profile at adlnet.gov
Hu's profile, with list of his recently published works, from the University of Memphis

Year of birth missing (living people)
Living people
21st-century American psychologists
Cognitive psychology
University of Memphis faculty
Place of birth missing (living people)
Nationality missing